Rene the Cane is a 1977 French-Italian crime film directed by  Francis Girod and starring Sylvia Kristel and Gérard Depardieu.

It was released in France in 1977 and recorded admissions of 534,714.

Cast

 Gérard Depardieu : René Bornier 
 Sylvia Kristel : Krista 
 Michel Piccoli : Inspector Marchand 
 Stefano Patrizi : Gino 
 Riccardo Garrone : Karl 
 Jacques Jouanneau : Fourgue 
 Jean Rigaux : Vieuchêne 
 Orchidea De Santis : Kim 
 Venantino Venantini : Carlo 
 Valérie Mairesse : Martine 
 Jean Carmet : Cannes Police Commissioner  
 Maria van der Meer : Krista's Mother
 Annie Walther : Martha 
 Doris Walther : Bretzel 
 Georges Conchon   
 Évelyne Bouix   
 Catherine Castel
 Marie-Pierre Castel

References

External links

French crime comedy-drama films
Films directed by Francis Girod
Films scored by Ennio Morricone
1970s French-language films
1970s French films